The Obi of Onitsha is the traditional leader of Onitsha, Anambra State, southeast Nigeria. The post of the Obi is recognized by the state and federal governments of Nigeria, and the Obi himself is seen as a representative of the people of Onitsha to the state and federal levels of government. The current Obi is His Majesty Igwe Nnaemeka Alfred Ugochukwu Achebe.

List of Onitsha sovereigns

References

 Obi of Onitsha celebrates Ofala Day - Nigeria Sun online
 https://web.archive.org/web/20070928043645/http://www.amightytree.org/okosi_funeral/announcements/formal_announcements.html
 https://imeobionitsha.org/sovereigns/

Onitsha monarchs